Lico may refer to:

Sports

Lico (footballer, born 1951), real name Antônio Nunes
Lico (footballer, born 1974), real name Fladimir da Cruz Freitas
Lico (footballer, born 1984), real name Paulo Cândido Serafim da Cruz
Lico Kaesemodel (born 1983), Brazilian racing driver, real name Orlando Otto Kaesemodel Neto
Lico Mederos (1890–death unknown), Cuban baseball player, real name Jésus Mederos
Dean Liço (born 2000), Albanian footballer

Other

Lico, West Virginia, a community in Kanawha County, West Virginia
Frederick "Lico" Reyes (1946–2019), Mexican-American actor and politician
Lico Jiménez (1851–1917), Cuban pianist and composer, real name José Manuel Jiménez Berroa
Mount Lico, a mountain in Mozambique
Linux Counter, a website that counted Linux users